Peter B. Jackson (born April 1, 1945) is a sailor who represented the United States Virgin Islands. He competed in the Star event at the 1972 Summer Olympics.

References

External links
 
 

1945 births
Living people
United States Virgin Islands male sailors (sport)
Olympic sailors of the United States Virgin Islands
Sailors at the 1972 Summer Olympics – Star
Place of birth missing (living people)